was a city located in Okinawa Prefecture, Japan. After the Ryūkyū Kingdom was annexed by Japan and the Magiri system abolished, the area was renamed Gushikawa village in 1908. Gushikawa was elevated to city status on July 1, 1968.

As of 2003, the city had an estimated population of 62,814 and a density of 1,963.55 persons per km². The total area was 31.99 km².

On April 1, 2005, Gushikawa, along with the city of Ishikawa, and the towns of Katsuren and Yonashiro (both from Nakagami District), was merged to create the city of Uruma.

Notable people from Gushikawa, Okinawa
 Tatsuo Shimabuku, Japanese karateka and founder of the Isshin-ryū karate style
 Kikuyo Ishikawa, Japanese former mixed martial artist

External links
City of Gushikawa website (archives)
Uruma official website

Dissolved municipalities of Okinawa Prefecture